The 1965 NAIA football season was the tenth season of college football sponsored by the NAIA.

The season was played from August to November 1965, culminating in the 1965 NAIA Championship Bowl, played this year again at ARC Stadium in Augusta, Georgia.

Saint John's (MN) defeated  in the Championship Bowl, 33–0, to win their second NAIA national title.

Conference realignment

Membership changes

Conference standings

Postseason

Bracket
{{4TeamBracket

| RD1         = SemifinalsNovember 27, 1965
| RD2         = ChampionshipDecember 11, 1965Augusta, GA

| seed-width  = 
| team-width  = 
| score-width =

| RD1-seed1   =
| RD1-team1   = 
| RD1-score1  = 7
| RD1-seed2   =
| RD1-team2   = Saint John's (MN)*
| RD1-score2  = 28

| RD1-seed3   =
| RD1-team3   = 
| RD1-score3  = 30
| RD1-seed4   =
| RD1-team4   = *
| RD1-score4  = 27

| RD2-seed1   =
| RD2-team1   = Saint John's (MN)
| RD2-score1  = 33| RD2-seed2   =
| RD2-team2   = Linfield
| RD2-score2  = 0
}}

Championship game outstanding playersBack: Stan Suchta, Saint John's (MN)Lineman:''' Fred Cremer, Saint John's (MN)

See also
 1965 NCAA University Division football season
 1965 NCAA College Division football season

References

 
NAIA Football National Championship